Pieces of the People We Love is the second studio album by American rock band the Rapture. It was released on September 12, 2006 in the United States through Universal Motown Records and in the United Kingdom through Vertigo Records. It was primarily produced by Paul Epworth and Ewan Pearson, with Danger Mouse producing two tracks.

This album saw bassist Mattie Safer taking a more prominent role in songwriting and also singing lead vocals on several songs, with multi-instrumentalist Gabriel Andruzzi also being involved in the band's songwriting for the first time. As a result, creative tensions arose between them and the band's co-founders, vocalist-guitarist Luke Jenner and drummer Vito Roccoforte. In 2011 Jenner said, "[Safer] also had ambitions himself, to be a songwriter, but that really came out strongly on Pieces of the People We Love. He wanted to write songs and so he started taking up a lot more space and Gabe joined the band. It became this power struggle between Mattie and Gabe and me and Vito and, um, Vito doesn't like conflict so it left me kind of versus Mattie and Gabe so I lost that one."

Track listing
 "Don Gon Do It"
 "Pieces of the People We Love" (produced by Danger Mouse)
 "Get Myself Into It"
 "First Gear"
 "The Devil"
 "Whoo! Alright-Yeah...Uh Huh"
 "Calling Me" (produced by Danger Mouse)
 "Down for So Long"
 "The Sound"
 "Live in Sunshine"
 "Shooting Star" (bonus track on copies purchased at Best Buy)
 "On and On" (bonus track available as a download with purchase of the UK edition)

Charts

References 

2006 albums
The Rapture (band) albums
Universal Motown Records albums
Vertigo Records albums
Albums produced by Danger Mouse (musician)
Albums produced by Ewan Pearson
Albums produced by Paul Epworth